Thomas Lovell Beddoes (30 June 1803 – 26 January 1849) was an English poet, dramatist and physician.

Biography 
Born in Clifton, Bristol, England, he was the son of Dr. Thomas Beddoes, a friend of Samuel Taylor Coleridge, and Anna, sister of Maria Edgeworth. He was educated at Charterhouse and Pembroke College, Oxford. He published in 1821 The Improvisatore, which he afterwards endeavoured to suppress. His next venture, a blank-verse drama called The Bride's Tragedy (1822), was published and well reviewed, and won for him the friendship of Barry Cornwall.

Beddoes' work shows a constant preoccupation with death. In 1824, he went to Göttingen to study medicine, motivated by his hope of discovering physical evidence of a human spirit which survives the death of the body. He was expelled, and then went to Würzburg to complete his training.  He then wandered about practising his profession, and expounding democratic theories which got him into trouble.  He was deported from Bavaria in 1833, and had to leave Zürich, where he had settled, in 1840.

He continued to write, but published nothing.

He led an itinerant life after leaving Switzerland, returning to England only in 1846, before going back to Germany.  He became increasingly disturbed, and committed suicide by poison at Basel, in 1849, at the age of 45.

For some time before his death he had been engaged on a drama, Death's Jest Book, which was published in 1850 with a memoir by his friend, T. F. Kelsall. His Collected Poems were published in 1851.

Reception 
Critics have faulted Beddoes as a dramatist. According to Arthur Symons, "of really dramatic power he had nothing. He could neither conceive a coherent plot, nor develop a credible situation." His plots are convoluted, and such was his obsession with the questions posed by death that his characters lack individuation; they all struggle with the same ideas that vexed Beddoes. But his poetry is "full of thought and richness of diction", in the words of John William Cousin, who praised Beddoes' short pieces such as "If thou wilt ease thine heart" (from Death's Jest-Book, Act II) and "If there were dreams to sell" ("Dream-Pedlary") as "masterpieces of intense feeling exquisitely expressed". Lytton Strachey referred to Beddoes as "the last Elizabethan", and said that he was distinguished not for his "illuminating views on men and things, or for a philosophy", but for the quality of his expression. Philip B. Anderson said the lyrics of Death's Jest Book, exemplified by "Sibylla's Dirge" and "The Swallow Leaves Her Nest", are "Beddoes' best work. These lyrics display a delicacy of form, a voluptuous horror, an imagistic compactness and suggestiveness, and, occasionally, a grotesque comic power that are absolutely unique."

References 

Sources
 

 Dabundo, L. Encyclopedia of romanticism: Culture in Britain, 1780s-1830s. (London: Routledge, 2011). .
 Donner, H.W., ed. The Works of Thomas Lovell Beddoes (Oxford: Oxford University Press, 1935).
 Donner, H.W., ed. Plays and Poems of Thomas Lovell Beddoes (London: Routledge and Kegan Paul Ltd., 1950).
 Ute Berns and Michael Bradshaw (eds), The Ashgate Research Companion to Thomas Lovell Beddoes (Aldershot, Ashgate, 2007) (The Nineteenth Century Series).

External links 

 Phantom-Wooer: The Thomas Lovell Beddoes Website – continues work of the Thomas Lovell Beddoes Society, 2006 to 2010
 "Text" at Phantom-Wooer – catalogues some online editions and provides many itself
 Doomsday: Journal of the Thomas Lovell Beddoes Society 
 Thomas Lovell Beddoes at The Literary Encyclopedia (litencyc.com)
 
 
 
 

Medical doctors from Bristol
Suicides by poison
1803 births
1849 deaths
Suicides in Switzerland
19th-century English medical doctors
People educated at Charterhouse School
English male dramatists and playwrights
English male poets
19th-century English poets
19th-century English dramatists and playwrights
19th-century English male writers
1840s suicides
Writers from Bristol